The 1994 Pontins Professional was the twenty-first edition of the professional invitational snooker tournament. it  took place in May 1994 in Prestatyn, Wales.

The tournament featured eight professional players. The quarter-final matches were contested over the best of 9 frames, the semi-finals best of eleven and the final best of seventeen.

Ken Doherty won the event, defeating Nigel Bond 9–5 in the final, and received £3,500 from the total prize fund of £12,000 as champion. Neal Foulds compiled the highest break of the competition, 129.

Main draw
Results for the tournament are shown below.

Final
Details of the final are shown below:

Century breaks
Two century breaks were made during the tournament:
129 
102

References

Pontins Professional
Snooker competitions in Wales
Pontins Professional
Pontins Professional
Pontins Professional